In Greek mythology, Ismenis was a Naiad nymph, one of the daughters of the Boeotian river god Ismenus: Ismenis is a patronymic rather than a given name. In Statius' Thebaid, Ismenis was the mother, by Pan, of Crenaeus, a defender of Thebes in the war of the Seven against Thebes. When Crenaeus was killed by Hippomedon whom he had challenged to single combat, Ismenis searched for his body which was carried away by the flow of River Ismenus, and, upon finding it, lamented her son's fate.

Note

References 
 Publius Papinius Statius, The Thebaid translated by John Henry Mozley. Loeb Classical Library Volumes. Cambridge, MA, Harvard University Press; London, William Heinemann Ltd. 1928. Online version at the Topos Text Project.
 Publius Papinius Statius, The Thebaid. Vol I-II. John Henry Mozley. London: William Heinemann; New York: G.P. Putnam's Sons. 1928. Latin text available at the Perseus Digital Library.

Naiads
Children of Potamoi
Boeotian characters in Greek mythology